William John Gascoyne ("Bill") Turner (October 20, 1952 – June 26, 1987) worked extensively as a composer, director, dramatist, producer and actor. He wrote for nearly 30 productions, including three operas and numerous musicals.

Mr. Turner began his theatrical career in Shorewood, Wisconsin, acting in or creating costumes for high school productions. At Shorewood High School he met his first collaborator, Lory Lazarus, and the two of them created their first musical together: The Reunion Of Sam, with Mr. Turner writing the music. This theater of the absurd musical was first performed in 1969 in their English class. The following year it received staged readings at various coffeehouses in the Milwaukee area, finally receiving a full production in 1973 when they were both students at the University of Wisconsin - Milwaukee. Also while attending UW-M, Mr. Turner created incidental music for Lazarus' Inanimation, performed by Milwaukee's Theatre X, and The Utopian And The Scab, performed by fellow drama students. They started work on their next musical, Farnum's Fabulous Freaks, but work on it came to a halt when Mr. Turner moved to Utah.

Trained at the American Conservatory Theater (ACT) in San Francisco, Mr. Turner also held a BFA in theatrical direction from Carnegie Mellon University.  As a directing student, he directed a production of Sondheim's Evening Primrose as well as the premiere of the musical Glitz! (book and lyrics by John Mangano, music by Charles Gilbert) for Scotch 'n' Soda, the student theater group at Carnegie Mellon.

As a founding member and artistic director of Theatre Express in Pittsburgh, Mr. Turner wrote, directed, produced or composed music for more than 24 productions from 1976 to 1980. His productions of the operas A Lyrical Opera Made By Two and The Unlit Corridor were performed throughout the east, most notably at the Long Wharf Theatre and La Mama E.T.C., both in 1980.  In addition to the premiere of his own works, he directed productions of Eugène Ionesco's Killing Game, Sam Shepard's Angel City, Richard Foreman and Stanley Silverman's Hotel for Criminals, Leon Katz's Son of Arlecchino, and William Bolcom and Arnold Weinstein's Dynamite Tonight.  During this time, he also was an artist in residence at Tufts University.

After Theatre Express folded in 1980, Turner and his partner, Mike Humphries, moved to Delaware, where he taught and directed (Shaw's You Never Can Tell) at the University of Delaware. He collaborated with composer and lyricist Charles Gilbert on a musical entitled B.G.D.F., and directed the premiere of that work in the summer of 1982.

Subsequently, Bill and Mike moved to New York City, where Bill created several original works (see below). He directed Al Carmines' Camp Meeting at the Cathedral of St. John the Divine in 1986, and his opera A Bird In The Hand, premiered in New York in 1985. He composed music for a staged reading of John Brown's Body in memory of Allen Fletcher, director of the American Conservatory Theater, and directed Al Carmines' Camp Meeting, a benefit staged to celebrate the fiftieth birthday of the author, a composer, lyricist, playwright, and priest.  During the last two years of his life, he found great satisfaction in his work as a literacy volunteer, teaching adults to read and write. He published the works of fourteen students in The Writing Group: 1986 Yearbook. He edited the collection from his hospital bed. He died of AIDS at the age of 34.

Turner's musical manuscripts are archived in the Music Collection of the New York Public Library.

Posthumous productions 
A Lyrical Opera Made By Two was produced by the University of the Arts in Philadelphia in 2005. That production toured in the UK in April 2005, where it was presented at the International Festival of Musical Theater in Cardiff, Wales. The work was also performed at the Liverpool Institute for Performing Arts (LIPA) and the Central School of Speech and Drama in London. The production was directed by Charles Gilbert, who has been designated by Turner's family as the artistic executor for this work.
The University of the Arts revived Made By Two in April 2011 as part of the Philadelphia International Festival of the Arts (PIFA).

References

External links
The Estate Project for Artists with AIDS
Show site for A Lyrical Opera Made By Two

1952 births
1987 deaths
AIDS-related deaths in New York (state)
20th-century American dramatists and playwrights
Carnegie Mellon University College of Fine Arts alumni